Dark Angel is a 1996 American television film, starring Eric Roberts. It was co-produced and directed by Robert Iscove.

Plot
Detective Walter D'Arcangelo is the only link to a serial killer who preys on adulterous women. In order to clear his name, Walter must solve the case before the killer strikes again.

Cast
 Eric Roberts as Walter D'Arcangelo
 Ashley Crow as Anna St. Cyr
 Linden Ashby as Harry Foley
 Gina Torres as LaMayne
 Paul Calderon as Vance Pickett

Release

Reception
Carole Horst from Variety wrote: "Script by TV vet John Romano doesn’t flag as mystery unfolds at a leisurely pace, although Roberts gets the only fully fleshed out character, delivering a sexy, wiseguy performance. Most everyone else has to walk that line between hip irony and outright overacting. Most fall on the wrong side.Robert Iscove’s direction is crisp and straightforward; Linda Burton’s production design and Francis Kenny’s camera make good use of the flavor of the city."

References

External links
 
 
 Dark An gel at TCM

1996 films
1990s English-language films
American television films
Films directed by Robert Iscove